Trần Quốc Ẩn (Nha Trang, 1961 - ) is a Vietnamese artist and calligrapher. He is notable for projects of large books, such as a 54 kg brush written and illustrated edition of 143 poems of Hoàng Quang Thuận.

References

1961 births
21st-century Vietnamese calligraphers
Date of birth missing (living people)
Living people
Vietnamese artists
Vietnamese calligraphers